47 Cygni is a triple star system in the northern constellation of Cygnus, and is located around 4,000 light years from the Earth. It is visible to the naked eye with a combined apparent visual magnitude of 4.61. The system is moving closer to the Earth with a heliocentric radial velocity of −4.6 km/s.

The dual nature of this system was recognized by Annie Cannon in 1912, and she assigned the pair separate Henry Draper Catalogue identifiers. It has been repeatedly resolved by speckle interferometery since 1973. Radio emission was detected from this system in 1985/86.

The supergiant primary is a slow irregular variable with an amplitude of about 0.1 magnitudes. Its close companion has 57% of the mass of the Sun. The secondary is a hot B-type main-sequence star, but still 2.5 magnitudes fainter than the primary.

References

K-type supergiants
B-type main-sequence stars
Triple stars
Spectroscopic binaries
Cygnus (constellation)
J20335419+3515031
BD+34 4079
Cygni, 47
196094
101474
7866
Slow irregular variables
Cygni, V2125